Charmaleh, also rendered as Chalmala and Chalmaleh, may refer to:
 Charmaleh-ye Olya
 Charmaleh-ye Sofla